The Carpathian Castle is a novel by Jules Verne first published in 1892. It is possible that Bram Stoker took inspiration from this for his 1897 novel Dracula. Due to castle aspect and local toponymy, it is assumed that  in Hunedoara county inspired Jules Verne.

Title
The original French title was Le Château des Carpathes and in English there are some alternate titles, such as The Castle of the Carpathians, The Castle in Transylvania, and Rodolphe de Gortz; or the Castle of the Carpathians.

Synopsis
In the village of Werst in the Carpathian mountains of Transylvania (in the then Austria-Hungary), some mysterious things are occurring and the villagers believe that Chort (the devil) occupies the castle. A visitor to the region, Count Franz de Telek, is intrigued by the stories and decides to go to the castle and investigate. He finds that the owner of the castle is Baron Rodolphe de Gortz, with whom he is acquainted; years earlier, they were rivals for the affections of the celebrated Italian prima donna La Stilla. The Count thought that La Stilla was dead, but he sees her image and hears her voice coming from the castle. It is later revealed that it was only a projected still image accompanying a high-quality phonograph recording.

In the media
 The 1981 Czechoslovak comedy feature film The Mysterious Castle in the Carpathians is based on this novel.

Further reading
 
 Isabelle Crépy. Un Prêtre en 1839 (1847) et Le Château des Carpathes (1892), influencés par le roman gothique anglais. Bulletin de la Société Jules Verne 118. Pages 41-43. 2e. trimestre 1996.

External links

 
The Castle of the Carpathians 
 

1892 French novels
1892 science fiction novels
Novels by Jules Verne
Culture of Transylvania
Transylvania in fiction
Novels set in Romania
Works set in castles
French novels adapted into films
Novels set in Hungary